Choi Jung-hoon (Hangul: 최정훈; born March 10, 1992) is a South Korean musician, singer, songwriter and record producer best known as the frontman and principal songwriter of the Korean indie rock band Jannabi.

Early life and education

Choi Jung-hoon was born on March 10, 1992, in Bundang, Seongnam, Gyeonggi Province. His family consists of his parents and an older brother. He was raised a Buddhist and spent his childhood and school days in Bundang's academy district called "Dolmaro" (he would go on to write the lyrics of the song Dolmaro in Jannabi's Legend album). He attended Bundang Elementary School, Seohyun Middle School and Yatap High School.

Choi displayed interest and talent in music from an early age. Since his fifth grade, he has liked writing essays and lyrics. Under the influence of his mother, he often listened and performed songs of Sanulrim, Elton John and The Beatles which were different from the likes of his peers. Although he was good in music, he dreamed of becoming a professional football player. However, Elton John's concert in South Korea and his poster advertisement that said "the best singer-songwriter in the world" left a deep impression on Choi. He thought that singer-songwriter was "the coolest job" after hearing his mother's explanation of the term, which inspired him to become such. 

In his middle and high school years, Choi met his future Jannabi bandmates Jang Kyung-joon and Kim Do-hyung and they would regularly perform at Bundang Central Park. He also served as the student council's president and reportedly ranked 8th in the entire school. Following graduation, he gained admission to Kyung Hee University, where he majored in Business administration, but decided to take a year off from college to pursue music. He trained at FNC Entertainment nearly debuting as a member of N.Flying, but decided to leave after realizing his creativity was restricted by the agency and he had different musical style from the group.

Career

2012–present: Jannabi 

In 2012, Jannabi was formed under an independent record label Peponi Music established and headed by Choi Jung-hoon's older brother, Choi Jung-joon. The band started from scratch, performing on clubs and busking on the streets of Hongdae and Insa-dong.

In August 2013, Jannabi auditioned for the fifth season of the survival audition show Superstar K to make their band known. While Kim Do-hyung and Yoo Young-hyun were eliminated, Choi continued to participate as a member of the newly created vocalist group Plan B. Plan B was later eliminated, reaching the Top 7 Qualifying Round.

On April 28, 2014, Choi officially made his debut as a member of Jannabi with the release of the single Rocket. In the same year, the band has continued to release digital singles November Rain and Pole Dance, first extended play (EP) See Your Eyes and several original sound tracks for Korean television dramas.

On August 4, 2016, Jannabi released its first studio album Monkey Hotel. About a year since the band's debut, he wrote lyrics of the songs with Kim and Yoo. For the following years, Choi performed as the sole lyricist and producer of the band's songs. He has hands-on involvement in the pre-production works of their albums, merchandise and shows.

In 2019, Jannabi has created an unprecedented sensation after releasing their second studio album Legend with the title track "For Lovers Who Hesitate." Aside from the songs in the album, their past songs simultaneously charted on the Circle Digital Chart and Billboard K-Pop Hot 100.

On November 6, 2020, Choi and Kim continued to record as a duo and released Jannabi's second EP Jannabi's Small Pieces I with the title song "A thought on an autumn night." The title track ranked first on various music charts in South Korea such as Bugs, Genie and Vibe.

On July 18, 2021, despite Kim and Jang Kyung-joon being on a hiatus due to military service, Choi has continued to promote the band with session musicians, releasing their third studio album The Land of Fantasy.

On May 10, 2022, Choi released Jannabi's third EP Jannabi's small pieces II: GRIPPIN'THEGREEN with all tracks written and produced by him. He revealed that the album was filled with "songs made at home, in the afternoon, mostly while looking out the window," with Choi hoping that listeners would listen to the EP like that as well. The EP's lead single "GRIPPIN'THEGREEN" ranked first on the Bugs! and quickly entered the Top 100 of Genie and Melon music charts.

2018–present: Solo activities 

In 2018, Choi Jung-hoon participated in the song "Lilac" from Changmo's EP The Moment of Contact. In December 2018, Choi competed on King of Mask Singer under the name "Ginger Man," appearing in episodes 183 and 184.

In 2019, following Jannabi's rise to fame, Choi appeared on various television shows, including KBS' In Sync where vocalists try to find their perfect match to do a duet, social commentary talk show Hello Counselor, and MBC's I Live Alone where he particularly gained attention by revealing his daily life.

In 2020, Choi participated in the 28th anniversary project of the fashion magazine Elle Korea called "RECONNECT." It features the song "For the Gone" written and composed by him alongside Code Kunst and Simon Dominic.

In March 2021, Choi appeared on Hangout with Yoo. In July 2021, he participated in the song "Next Episode" from AKMU's EP of the same title Next Episode. In October 2021, he participated in the 25th anniversary tribute for punk rock band No Brain by remaking their song "Midnight Music," track from No Brain's 5th album That is Youth (2007) in Jannabi's own style.

In February 2022, it was announced that Choi will join JTBC's music entertainment show Hot Singers as a music director alongside Kim Moon-jeong. The show centers on the journey of Korea's famous senior actors in singing songs together while telling the stories of their lives. He created the Korean language version of the song "This Is Me" which was performed by the choir at the 58th Baeksang Arts Awards to conclude the show. From April to May 2022, he led a film photo exhibition called "Days of Future Passed" in collaboration with Allycamera. The exhibition follows Choi's daily life from morning to night, showcasing his point of view and his brother's photographic works. In May 2022, he joined the two-track project of singer-songwriter Jo Dong-hee and composer Jo Dong-Ik by singing the song "Until I love the love." The song has an exquisite blend of understated acoustic melodies and electronic sounds that lead to a calm atmosphere. On September 23, 2022, Choi appeared as an original singer on the seventh season of Hidden Singer. The show's sixth episode introduced Jannabi as "the first place in festival recruitment." The episode ranked first in the same time slot and Choi took sixth place in the overall ranking of entertainment performers. On September 26, 2022, a song collaboration "Because We Loved" with Kang Min-kyung was released, eventually ranking first on various music charts such as Bugs! and Genie.

In February 2023, Choi became an official member of the Korea Music Copyright Association. In March 2023, Choi is set to star on SBS's new variety show, No Math School Trip, alongside D.O., Zico, Crush, Yang Se-chan and Lee Yong-jin, which will be directed by Running Man'''s former director, Choi Bo Pil.

 Artistry 

South Korean media outlets regarded Choi as one of the "sentimental craftsman" of his generation with "expressive power." He is an all-round musician who directly participates in writing, composing, arranging and producing majority of Jannabi's songs and a number of radio logo songs as well as planning performances, directing and making costumes. The poster for Jannabi's 10th solo concert was drawn by himself. Over 100 registered songs are credited to him by the Korea Music Copyright Association. He has the ability to play various instruments proficiently, but mainly uses acoustic guitar and piano. His poetic lyrics and emotional melodies involve themes of fantasy and imagination, moments of life, love and society that "awakened empathy" among people. Choi cites Elton John, Paul McCartney, The Beatles and Sanulrim as his main musical inspirations. 

Music critics and listeners described him as an "unlearned" vocalist and characterized his voice with unique husky tone and personality that does not use standard singing method, possessing a "vintage voice reminiscent of the old times."

In February 2023, Choi was promoted to a full member of the Korea Music Copyright Association.

Other ventures

Endorsement

In September 2021, Choi was chosen as the model for the fall and winter sneaker collection of Umbro, themed "Heritage of Passion." He later became the ambassador for the clothing brand Custom Mellow by the  Kolon Industries FnC. It was the first time for the brand to collaborate with an artist in a music project which included the production of the music video for "King of Romance," one of the tracks from Jannabi's third full-length album The Land of Fantasy'' (2021) and other advertisement campaigns.

In May 2022, Choi became the endorser of Sennheiser's Momentum True Wireless 3 earbuds. In July 2022, Choi alongside Ahn Seul-ki served as the brand ambassadors for the ad campaign "Runners Helping Runners" by Nike. In September 2022, Shinsegae International decided to start the menswear business of Studio Tomboy and selected Choi as the model.

Philanthropy

Choi has regularly donated the band's festival appearance fees under the name of Jannabi for the school development and educational environment improvement of Kyung Hee University. In 2022, his donation provided free meals for 1,500 university students.

Personal life

Choi was exempted from mandatory military service due to an anterior cruciate ligament injury caused by a football tackle.

Discography

Singles

Filmography

Television shows

Radio

Hosting

References

Living people
1992 births
21st-century South Korean male singers
South Korean record producers
South Korean singer-songwriters
Rock songwriters
Indie rock musicians
People from Gyeonggi Province
Kyung Hee University alumni
Superstar K participants